The provinces of Cuba are divided into 168 municipalities or municipios. They were defined by Cuban Law Number 1304 of July 3, 1976 and reformed in 2010 with the abrogation of the municipality of Varadero and the creation of two new provinces: Artemisa and Mayabeque in place of former La Habana Province.

Summary
The municipalities are listed below, by province:

List of municipalities

Municipal maps
The maps below show the municipal subdivision of each province, in yellow, within Cuba. Each provincial capital is shown in red.

Note:

 – Exceptions related to the provinces shown only in red: Havana is a city-province, and shows also its 15 municipal boroughs. Isla de la Juventud is a special (and single) municipality having provincial level.

See also
Provinces of Cuba
List of cities in Cuba
List of places in Cuba

References

External links

 
Subdivisions of Cuba
Cuba, Municipalities
Cuba 2
Municipalities, Cuba
Municipalities